Acleris cervinana is a species of moth of the family Tortricidae. It is found in North America, where it has been recorded across Canada from British Columbia to New Brunswick and south to California and Alabama in the United States.

The wingspan is 15–17 mm. The forewings are usually deep orange-brown, with a dark brown costal triangle enclosing a white rectangular spot on the costa. In form americana, the ground colour is paler and more fawn-coloured. Furthermore, the white spot in the costal triangle is replaced by one of the ground colour. Adults have been recorded on wing nearly year round.

The larvae feed on Betula alleghaniensis, Corylus and Alnus species.

References

Moths described in 1882
cervinana
Moths of North America